New Testament Church of God may refer to:
New Testament Church of God, Jamaica, branches of the Church of God (Cleveland, Tennessee) in most Caribbean countries bear the prefix "New Testament".
New Testament Christian Churches of America, founded as the New Testament Church of God
New Testament Church of God the Rock in Birmingham, England
New Testament Church of God Cathedral of Praise in north London, England
Worshippers at Presbyterian Church, Aldershot, England